Radstockiceras is an extinct genus of lower Jurassic ammonite that lived from Oxynotum zone of upper Sinemurian to Raricostatum zone of lower Pliensbachian. Shells of these animals were oxycone and involute with umbilicus that took maximum of 12% of diameter in the case of outer whorls. On inner whorls, venter has been sharp, but then it became rounded. Faint ribs had falcoid shape, but sometimes, ribs could absent. Shells could have been large in their size. Suture has been very complex, similar to Oxynoticeras, but culmination at umbilical margin has been missing. Genus has been named after town of Radstock, in Somerset.

Distribution
Fossils belonging to this genus are found in Europe, South America, North Africa and Turkey.

References

Oxynoticeratidae
Ammonitida genera
Jurassic ammonites
Jurassic ammonites of Europe
Ammonites of Africa
Ammonites of Asia
Sinemurian life
Pliensbachian life
Hasle Formation